Leptocorticium is a genus of crust fungi in the family Corticiaceae. A 2008 estimate placed five species in the widespread genus; a sixth, L. indicum, was described from India in 2014.

References

External links

Corticiales
Agaricomycetes genera